Ian Greenidge, better known by his stage name Donae'o (meaning Gift from God), is a British singer, songwriter and rapper from North-West London. He has worked with numerous British musicians throughout his career including The Streets, Giggs, Lethal Bizzle, Dizzee Rascal, Jme, and Calvin Harris.

Career
The single "I'm Fly", released by Donae'o in 2009, reached No. 129 on the UK Singles Chart. 
His studio album Party Hard was released the same year.

In 2016, Donae'o produced and featured on Giggs' single "Lock Doh". It peaked at number 52 on the UK Singles Chart, number 5 on the UK Independent Chart and number 12 on the UK R&B Chart, becoming Giggs' highest charting single. In April 2017, the single was certified Gold by BPI Music with 400,000 sales.

In 2017, Donae'o released his mixtape, Sixteen, which featured cuts with Fredo, Young T & Bugsey, Ghetts, Wretch 32 and the late Cadet.

In 2019, Donae'o launching his record label Movin Anti, a joint-venture with Island Records.

Personal life
Donae'o is of Ghanaian and Guyanese descent.

Discography

Studio albums

Singles

As lead artist

Other releases/songs

Awards
 2003 People's Choice Awards, Best Live P.A.: "Bounce"
 2009 MOBO Awards, Best UK Act (nominated)

References

21st-century Black British male singers
Black British male rappers
Living people
Rappers from London
Year of birth missing (living people)
English people of Ghanaian descent
English people of Guyanese descent